What Will Be is William Beckett's third EP.  It was released on October 30, 2012 under YIKE Records.  Beckett later recorded acoustic versions of every song on this EP for The Pioneer Sessions.

Track listing 

2012 EPs
William Beckett (singer) albums